Jordan Dykstra is an American composer and violist from Sioux City, Iowa.

Academically, Dykstra studied composition at CalArts with Michael Pisaro, Wolfgang von Schweinitz, and Ulrich Krieger; privately with Daníel Bjarnason, Chiyoko Szlavnics, and at Wesleyan University with Alvin Lucier. Dykstra contributed to the score of the 2017 psychological thriller/horror film It Comes At Night (dir. Trey Edward Shults), which received the NYT Critic's Pick from A.O. Scott, film critic at the New York Times. He has also worked as a composer on film music for Gus Van Sant's 2011 film Restless, Penny Lane's 2019 documentary Hail Satan?, and the 2019 narrative film Blow the Man Down which was directed by Bridget Savage Cole and Danielle Krudy. Dykstra was a session violist and string director for Dirty Projectors' 2009 album Bitte Orca and has performed at venues worldwide including MOCA, Los Angeles, CA, the RISD Museum in Providence, RI, the Portland Art Museum in Portland, OR, Harpa Concert Hall in Reykjavik, Iceland, and at the Syros Institute in Ano Syros, Greece.

While in Val Verde, CA in 2015, Jordan Dykstra founded Editions Verde, which publishes art and musical objects.

Discography

as Jordan Dykstra (film composer, performer, audio recording engineer, music consultant) 
 Globes (2021) Avila Film - premiered at 2021 Ji.Hlava International Documentary Film Festival on October 27, 2021
 Magic Hour (2020) - premiered at Tribeca Film Festival on June 18, 2020
 Blow the Man Down (2019) Amazon Studios - premiered at the Tribeca Film Festival on April 26, 2019
 Hail Satan? (2019) Magnolia Pictures - premiered at the 2019 Sundance Film Festival on January 25, 2019
 Documenting Hate (2018) PBS/ProPublica - Emmy nominated 2-part series which premiered on FRONTLINE on August 7, 2017
 It Comes At Night (2017) A24 - premiered at the Overlook Film Festival at Timberline Lodge on April 29, 2017 
 Restless (2011) Sony Pictures Classic - premiered at the 2011 Cannes Film Festival on May 12, 2011

as Jordan Dykstra
The Arrow of Time - CD for string quintet and percussion, chamber ensemble (2 violas, vibraphone, pedal synthesizer, reed organ), string trio, duet of viola and Sheng, and solo piano with hand-crank siren and fixed playback (New World Records, September 2020)
14 Horse Bells - CD for electronics, viola, percussion, and prepared speakers with electronics (Editions Verde, September 2020)
A Known Unknown - Bundle containing sheet music, CD, and download code - for grand piano, percussion, and electronics (Editions Verde, June 2018)
Found Clouds - CD for vibraphone, pedal harp, Farfisa organ, and grand piano (Editions Verde, March 2018)
Is Land a Voice - CD for field recording, air-horns, and sine-tones (Editions Verde, March 2017)
The Psychological Future - digital LP for gamelan, percussion, viola, cello, double bass, and sine-tones (January 2017)
Chimes Nine Times - digital EP for viola, electric guitar, and sine-tones (July 2016)
Stressings - CD (Editions Verde, April 2016)
Elegant Music - digital EP for viola, koto, noh-kan, ryūteki, and percussion (June 2015)
Three Horns - digital EP for air-horn and sine-tones in 3 movements (May 2015)
Like a Sun That Pours Forth Light but Never Warmth - digital LP, composed for Allie Hankins' solo dance show at Conduit Dance Studio in Portland, Ore. from October 24–26, 2014 (January 2015)
Audition - LP (Marriage Records / Shatter Your Leaves / Modern Documents, August 2014)
Phonography - digital album of 20 field recordings (March 2014)
Sundries - ongoing digital album (2013–present)
Pianodrones - digital EP card in 3 movements (December, 2012)
A Quiet Night - film score (April, 2011) for "A Quiet Night"

as DASH!
TSS REMIXES - digital download card (Self released, March 2013)
TAKES SWIFT STRIDES - digital download card (Marriage Records, August 2009)

with Alvin Lucier 
 Out of Our Hands - LP (Important Records, March 2022)

with Koen Nutters 
 In Better Shape Than You Found Me - CD (elsewhere, October 2021)

with Beau Breather 
 College Hotel - CD (Editions Verde, August 2016)

with Tom Blood and Jordan Dykstra
Seems Like It Means Something Else from EXP3 (Editions Verde, March 2016)
Preludes (November 2014)*
Greatest Hits Live: Volume One (May 2012)*
A June Afternoon (June 2011)*
The Act (June 2011)*
*Digital EPs

with The Righteous and Harmonious Fists
Fangs, But No Fanks – Split 7-inch EP with White Fang (Marriage Records, 2008)

Credits
20 Days in Mariupol directed by Mstyslav Chernov, composer (PBS Frontline/AP News, 2023)
Michael Flynn's Holy War directed by Rick Rowley, music consultant (PBS Frontline/AP News, 2022)
Plot to Overturn the Election directed by Sam Black, composer, viola, piano, percussion (PBS Frontline/ProPublica, 2022)
Globes directed by Nina de Vroome, piano, viola, percussion, programming (Avila Film, 2021)
Magic Hour directed by Che Grayson, synth, viola, percussion, programming (2020) - premiered at Tribeca Film Festival on June 18, 2020 
Blow the Man Down directed by Bridget Savage Cole and Danielle Krudy, co-composed with Brian McOmber, string arranger, viola, prepared piano, percussion (Amazon Studios, 2020), film soundtrack (Editions Verde, 2020)
It Comes At Night directed by Trey Shults, assistant composer with Brian McOmber, string arranger, viola, percussion, musical collaborator, synthesizer and electronics, additional music preparation, recording engineer (A24, 2017), film soundtrack (Milan Records, 2017)
Like a Sun that Pours Forth Light but Never Warmth by Allie Hankins, composer, string quintet director, and viola, dance performance (October, 2014)
Identify by Caspar Sonnet, composer and viola, LP (Marriage Records, 2013)
Belfast Sessions by Davis Hooker, string trio director, composer, and viola, LP (self-released, 2012)
Annabel's Wake written by Jordan Dykstra and Danny Elfman, composer and mellotron, Restless (2011 film) directed by Gus Van Sant, film soundtrack (Sony Pictures Classics, 2011)
Bitte Orca by Dirty Projectors, string quartet director and viola, LP (Domino Recording Company, 2009)
Stillness Is The Move by Dirty Projectors, string quartet director and viola, LP (Domino Recording Company, 2009)
False Face Society by Valet, composer and viola, LP (Mexican Summer, 2009)
Malaikat Dan Singa by Arrington De Dionyso, composer and viola, LP and CD (K Records, 2009)
Caffeine, Alcohol, Sunshine, Money by Jared Mees and the Grown Children, composer, string director, and viola, CD (Tender Loving Empire, 2008)

Other projects
 Rob Walmart - an improvised electronic music collective

Notes

References

External links
 Official site
 Jordan Dykstra on IMDB
 Editions Verde

Musicians from Iowa
Ambient musicians
Experimental composers
American experimental musicians
American violists
21st-century American composers
21st-century classical composers
American film score composers
American male film score composers
1985 births
Living people
20th-century violists
21st-century violists